The National State Assembly (NSA) was the legislative body of Sri Lanka established in May 1972 under the First Republican Constitution. The assembly was introduced by Prime Minister Sirimavo Bandaranaike under the United Front Government replacing the Parliament of Ceylon, a bicameral arrangement set up with the Soulbury Commission.

The major changes were an increase in the authority of the government, described as "a vehicle for the sovereignty of the people". It gave the government the power to act without constitutional restraints, with the courts having no rights to question the validity of the laws passed by the assembly. All laws passed by the NSA were valid until repealed by the assembly itself. The assembly saw the introduction of socialist principles and a constitutional foundation to the pre-eminent position of Sinhala and Buddhism. Both the judiciary and Civil Service came under political control. The assembly was unicameral and initially consisted of the 151 elected members of its predecessor the House of Representatives, as the Senate had been abolished in 1971. The first amendment to the current constitution was to increase the number of members to 168.

The  current Constitution of Sri Lanka, adopted on 7 September 1978, replaced the National State Assembly with the Parliament of Sri Lanka.

List of Parliaments

Members

Speakers

 Stanley Tillekeratne (1972–77)
 Anandatissa de Alwis (1977–78)

Deputy Speaker and Chairman of Committees

 I. A. Cader (1972–77)
 Mohammed Abdul Bakeer Markar (1977–78)

See also
 Parliament of Ceylon
 Parliament of Sri Lanka

References

External links
Parliament of Sri Lanka

1972 establishments in Sri Lanka
1978 disestablishments in Sri Lanka
Government of Sri Lanka
Defunct unicameral legislatures